Hendrich may refer to:

 Hermann Hendrich (1854-1931), German painter
 Hendrich (footballer) (born 1986), Hendrich Miller Meireles Bernardo, Brazilian football attacking midfielder
 Kathrin Hendrich (born 1992), German football defender
 Hendrich's Drop Forge, museum in Solingen, Germany

See also
 Henrich
 Hendrick (disambiguation)
 Hendrik (disambiguation)

Surnames from given names